Haimer is a small hamlet in Caithness, Scotland. It is located on a road just off the A836 and consists of several small settlements and farming facilities. Thurso is quite close by, being about a mile away to the west and the suburb of Mount Pleasant is just a short distance away. There are several public facilities including a hotel as part of the settlement and a supermarket in Mount Pleasant.

References

Populated places in Caithness